The Making of Minutes to Midnight is the sixth DVD by Linkin Park, released on May 14, 2007 through Warner Bros. Records and Machine Shop Records.

The release documented the band while recording their third studio album, Minutes to Midnight. It was included in the limited edition of the album. It also features the band recording some demos like "QWERTY", "No Roads Left" and "Across the Line", which were later released in the LP Underground extended plays and in the EP, Songs from the Underground.

Chapter listing

Personnel

Linkin Park 
 Chester Bennington – lead vocals
 Rob Bourdon – drums, backing vocals
 Brad Delson – guitars, backing vocals
 Joe Hahn – DJ, sampling, backing vocals
 Dave "Phoenix" Farrell – bass, backing vocals
 Mike Shinoda – keyboards, vocals, piano, rapping, guitar

Production 
 Produced by: Films Di Bovino
 Executive producers: Rob McDermott (for Mad Mac Entertainment), Devin Sarno (for Warner Bros.)
 Associate Producers: Ryan Demarti and Trish Evangelista (for Mad Mac Entertainment)
 Edited by: Mark Fiore, Dennis Warren
 Additional Editing: Bill Berg-Hillenger
 Crane operator: Kendall Whelpton
 Directed and Filmed by: Mark Fiore
 DVD-video producers: David May, Raena Winscott (associate producer)
 Post Audio Mix: The Outpost Sound Mixing Company
 Audio Mix Engineer: Tony Friedman
 Menu Design: Sean Donelly
 Additional Graphics: Frand Maddocks
 Final Color: Filmlock, Inc.
 Colorist: Sam Dlugach
 Technical director: Linkin Park
 Motion Graphics: Dennis Warren
 Photography for package: Mark Fiore
 Art direction and design: Mike Shinoda

Band Interview Footage
 Interviews by: Corey Moss
 Producer: Micheal Perlmutter (for Almost Midnight Productions)
 Director of Photography: Mark Ritchie
 Sound: Todd Lotoszinki
 Assistant Camera: Jeremy Look
 Make Up: Karma Ritchie

References 

2007 films
American documentary films
Linkin Park video albums
2007 video albums
Documentary films about heavy metal music and musicians
Warner Records video albums
2000s American films